Abdul Hafeez Sheikh is a Pakistani economist and politician who served as Federal Minister for Finance and Revenue Affairs from 11 December 2020 to 29 March 2021. Previously, he served as an advisor to Prime Minister on Finance and Revenue from April 2019 to December 2020. 

Previously, he has served as the Finance Minister of Pakistan between 2010 and 2013 and Provincial Minister for Finance and Planning in Government of Sindh between 2000 and 2002. He also had been member of the Senate of Pakistan from 2003 to 2006 and again from 2006 to 2012 and then again from 2012 and 2018.

From 18 April 2019 to 11 December 2020 he served as an advisor to the Prime Minister of Pakistan for Finance after the cabinet reshuffle by Prime Minister Imran Khan. Since 11 December 2020, he had served as the federal minister of finance and revenue affairs. He was removed as Minister of Finance on 29 March 2021, in lieu of heavy public pressure on Imran Khan because of rising inflation. He was replaced by Hammad Azhar.

On March 30 2021, he tested positive for Covid-19.

Early life and education
He was born in Jacobabad, Sindh. He holds Masters and Doctorate degree in Economics from the Boston University.

Academic career
Shaikh well-known work includes a book on Argentina's privatisation program.

After his higher education, Shaikh joined the faculty of Harvard University in Cambridge, Massachusetts where he led a research project for his doctoral students. While at Harvard, he also advised several countries on their economic policies and programs.

Political career

In 2000, he was made the Provincial Minister of Sindh for Finance and Planning in the  military government.

He was elected to the Senate of Pakistan as a candidate of Pakistan Muslim League (Q) from Sindh in March 2003. He had been member of the Senate between 2003 and 2006. Later in April 2003, he was made the Federal Minister for Privatisation in Musharraf government.

He was again elected to the Senate of Pakistan as a candidate of Pakistan Peoples Party (PPP) from Sindh in March 2006. He had been member of the Senate between 2006 and 2012. In March 2010, he was made the Finance Minister of Pakistan in Gillani ministry.

He was again elected to the Senate of Pakistan as a candidate of PPP from Sindh in 2012. He had been member of the Senate between 2012 and 2016. In February 2013, he resigned as the Finance Minister of Pakistan.

In April 2019, he was appointed as an Advisor to the Prime Minister of Pakistan for Finance after a cabinet reshuffle by Prime Minister Imran Khan.

On 11 December 2020, He was appointed as Federal Minister of Finance and Revenue. He was removed from his office as federal minister for finance and revenue on 29 March 2021.

He contested for the 2021 Pakistani Senate election on a general seat from the National Assembly of Pakistan. He got 164 votes and lost to his rival Syed Yousuf Raza Gillani, who got 169 votes.

Other activities
 Islamic Development Bank, Ex-Officio Member of the Board of Governors (since 2019)
 World Bank, Ex-Officio Member of the Board of Governors (since 2019)

References 

Living people
Pakistani economists
Pakistani senators (14th Parliament)
Pakistan Muslim League (Q) politicians
Pakistan People's Party politicians
Harvard University faculty
Year of birth missing (living people)
Boston University College of Arts and Sciences alumni
Finance Ministers of Pakistan
Provincial ministers of Sindh
Imran Khan administration
Government of Yousaf Raza Gillani
People from Jacobabad District
Private equity and venture capital investors
Pakistani expatriates in the United States